Dicken may refer to:
 Dicken, St. Gallen, a hamlet in Neckertal, St. Gallen, Switzerland
a type of silver coin of the 15th to 18th centuries, viz. "thick" silver coins minted based after the Italian fashion of the silver Testone introduced in the 1470s. First used in Switzerland (Berne 1482), in the 17th century minted throughout the Holy Roman Empire most often with the denomination of a third of a gulden
an English surname (from Dick) and given name
 Dicken Ashworth (born 1946), English actor
 Dicken Schrader (born 1973), Colombian-American video artist
 Dicken or Jeff Pain, British musician with Mr Big

See also 
 Dickens (disambiguation)
 Dickon
 Dickin Medal, a UK award honouring the work of animals in war
 Diken, a town and a nagar panchayat in Neemuch, Madhya Pradesh, India